The Zetra Ice Rink or Zetra Stadium is an outdoor venue located in Sarajevo, Bosnia and Herzegovina. Constructed between 1981 and 1982, it hosted the speed skating events for the 1984 Winter Olympics.

This venue is located near the Olympic Hall Juan Antonio Samaranch, formerly known as the Zetra Ice Rink.

References
1984 Winter Olympics official report. pp. 73-86, 105-8.

Venues of the 1984 Winter Olympics
Olympic speed skating venues
Speed skating venues
Sports venues in Sarajevo